Ghannouch  is a town and commune in the Gabès Governorate on the Gulf of Gabès, occasionally named after this town instead, in Tunisia. As of 2004 it had a population of 22,681.

See also
List of cities in Tunisia

References

Populated places in Gabès Governorate
Communes of Tunisia
Tunisia geography articles needing translation from French Wikipedia